Year Of The Witch is a 2004, album by Seven Witches and the last to feature James Rivera on vocals. The first track, "Metal Asylum", is a tribute to all the bands that have inspired them, and last eight tracks are a concept about a man named Jacob.

Track listing
 Metal Asylum (3:54)
 Year of the Witch (3:56)
 Fires Below (4:16)
 Cries of the Living (4:18)
 If You Were God (4:02)
 Can't Find My Way (4:31)
Jacob
 Act 1: Whispers (0:42)
 Act 2: Voice of Jacob (3:43)
 Act 3: Mirror to Me (1:17)
 Act 4: Haunting Dreams (3:52)
 Act 5: Jacob Speaks (0:04)
 Act 6: Circles (2:22)
 Act 7: The Prophet is You (4:37)
 Act 8: Dream or Reality (0:20)

Personnel
The band
 James Rivera - Vocals
 Jack Frost - Guitars
 Dennis Hayes - Bass
With
 Craig Anderson - Drums
 Eric Ragno - Keyboards & Piano
 Dave Ellefson - Bass on track 5

References

2004 albums
Seven Witches albums
Sanctuary Records albums